Romanovka is a rural locality (a village) in Kabakovsky Selsoviet, Karmaskalinsky District, Bashkortostan, Russia. The population was 7 as of 2010. There are 2 streets.

Geography 
Romanovka is located 27 km northwest of Karmaskaly (the district's administrative centre) by road. Novomusino is the nearest rural locality.

References 

Rural localities in Karmaskalinsky District